Paulo Francisco Noronha (born 12 September 1966) is a Mozambican former athlete. He competed in the men's triple jump at the 1988 Summer Olympics.

References

External links
 

1966 births
Living people
Athletes (track and field) at the 1988 Summer Olympics
Mozambican male triple jumpers
Olympic athletes of Mozambique
Place of birth missing (living people)